West Chesterfield could refer to:

 the West Chesterfield Historic District in Chesterfield, Massachusetts
 West Chesterfield, New Hampshire
 a neighborhood in Chatham, Chicago